Kuznetsovo is a rural locality (a village) in Nozhkinskoye Rural Settlement of Chukhlomsky District, Kostroma Oblast, Russia. Its population is 0 as of 2014.

History 
The village received this name in 1966.

References

External links 
 Kuznetsovo on bankgorodov.ru

Rural localities in Kostroma Oblast
Chukhlomsky District